Football Club Stumbras was a professional football club, based in Kaunas, Lithuania, which played in A Lyga, the top tier of Lithuanian football. Founded in 2013 on the basis of the NFA, the club has reached the heights of Lithuanian football in a fairly short period of time. It became infamous for one-sided footballer contracts. The club stopped functioning mid-season in 2019 after the owner pulled out the funds. The club played its home matches at the Darius and Girėnas Stadium (capacity 9,180) and used the NFA stadium in Kaunas (capacity 500) as an alternative.

Name history
2013 – FC Stumbras Kaunas

History
The club was established in 2013 on the basis of the Nacionalinė Futbolo Akademija team, adopting the name FC Stumbras and playing in II Lyga Southern Zone. The majority of the team's players were under 20 years old. Stumbras finished 2nd in the league and were promoted to I Lyga for the next year.

In 2014 FC Stumbras was able to sign a few more experienced players to go with their youth, most notably former national team striker and Kaunas native Artūras Rimkevičius. Stumbras started out the season strongly winning the first 8 matches. In July 2014, during the break, it was announced that 3 starting squad players Martynas Zaleckis, Klaidas Janonis and Klaudijus Upstas would leave the team, Rolandas Čepkauskas becoming the new head coach was announced a few days after. FC Stumbras went on to finish the regular season 3rd, making it to the second phase. After beating FK Nevėžis 4–1 in the last match of the season, Stumbras secured 1st place in the league and Artūras Rimkevičius was declared top goal scorer with 26. The last team to represent the second largest city in Lithuania in A Lyga was FBK Kaunas in 2012. FC Stumbras chairman Vytautas Vaškūnas confirmed that the club would use their right to play in the top Lithuanian league in 2015 and Kaunas would have a team in A Lyga once again, he also confirmed the club would bring back Rimkevičius and would most likely strengthen the squad even more the following season.

Stumbras made it official that they would like to join the premier Lithuanian football league for the 2015 season, on the second check up Stumbras was accepted. Getting ready for the 2015 season Stumbras already proved their worth playing matches against Lithuanian and foreign clubs, losing only once to Estonian Champions FC Levadia 1-0. On 28 January 2015, it was announced that 6 new players would join the club Nerijus Mačiulis, Tomas Snapkauskas, Mantvydas Eiza, Martynas Dapkus, Giedrius Kvedaras and Aleksandr Sikorskiy, later Darius Gvildys was announced as new head coach. Before the start of the season, Stumbras management surprised everyone when announcing that fans are welcome to watch them play for free for their home matches. On 28 February 2015, FC Stumbras debuted in A Lyga beating FK Šiauliai 3-1 in Kaunas.

In 2019 Stumbras started the season very well by winning against FK Sūduva Marijampolė and FK Žalgiris Vilnius, claiming the top position of the A Lyga table. However, after the first half of the season the club ran into financial problems. The players and staff started leaving the team. The club was stripped of the place in 2019–20 UEFA Europa League and it's A Lyga license revoked. The club became defunct shortly afterwards.

Stadium

The club plays its home matches at the Darius and Girėnas Stadium. Stadium is a multi-use stadium in the Ąžuolynas park in Žaliakalnis district of Kaunas, Lithuania. The all-seater stadium holds 9,180. In 1998 the stadium was renovated according to UEFA regulations, and in 2005 it was modernised with the installation of the biggest stadium television screen in the Baltic states.

Crest and colours
Only in 2013 after adapting the name Stumbras, the crest came along with it. It features a blue bison with a football being squashed under its leg on the background of a white shield with red borders and then placed on another shield which is blue with white text saying FC Stumbras at the top and Kaunas in smaller text under it. The choice of name and branding for the club is believed to be a reference to the historic coat of arms of Kaunas, which from 1935 to 1992 featured a white bison instead of an aurochs.

Since the beginning, the club has used the colors blue and white on their kits. The logo contained some red; at the start of the 2015 season the club played its debut match with new kits that introduced the color red to their uniforms.

Kit manufacturers

 2013–2014 Adidas
 2015–2019 Hummel

Kit evolution 
 Home kit: blue shirt, blue shorts and white socks. Signs and details on shirts and shorts are white.

Achievements
LFF I Lyga Championship: 1
 2014

Lithuanian Cup:
Winners - 1
2017
Runners-up - 1
2018

Participation in Lithuanian championships

 2013 II Lyga (Southern Zone) – 2nd
 2014 I Lyga – 1st
 2015 A Lyga – 7th
 2016 A Lyga – 6th
 2017 A Lyga - 7th
 2018 A Lyga - 4th
 2019 A Lyga - 8th (defunct in middle of the season)

European record

As of July 2018

Notes
 QR: Qualifying round

Last squad before dissolving

Staff
As of 5 March 2019.

Managers
 Gerhardas Kvedaras (2010–2014)
 Rolandas Čepkauskas (2014–2015)
 Darius Gvildys (2015–2016)
 Mariano Barreto (2016–2018)
 João Luís Martins (2019)

Partnership

 Benfica
 Sporting CP

References

External links
Official Website
 FC Stumbras Facebook official page
 alyga.lt Stumbras page
 lietuvosfutbolas.lt Stumbras page
 twitter.com/fcstumbras
 Soccerway
 eurofootball.lt

 
Football clubs in Kaunas
2013 establishments in Lithuania
Association football clubs established in 2013
Defunct football clubs in Lithuania
Association football clubs disestablished in 2019
2019 disestablishments in Lithuania